General elections were held in Sweden on 17 September 2006, to elect members to the Riksdag, the Swedish national legislature. All 349 seats were up for election: 310 fixed seats in 29 constituencies and 39 adjustment seats, used to ensure that parties have representation in the Riksdag proportional to their share of the national vote. The electoral system used was semi-open list proportional representation using the Sainte-Laguë method of allocating seats. Elections for County and Municipal councils were also held on the same day.

Fredrik Reinfeldt from the Moderate Party was able to form a majority government together with the Centre Party, Liberal People's Party and the Christian Democrats following the election. The Social Democrats were ousted after twelve years in power. It was the country's first majority government since the second Fälldin cabinet fell in 1981.

Reinfeldt reached out to working-class votes in the re-branding as the 'New Moderates', which resulted in sizeable gains in historically left-wing locations in densely populated areas. As a result, several municipalities that had never voted blue before in Stockholm County flipped. This, combined with a landslide overall win in the capital region as a whole and strong showings in Scania tipped the balance in favour of the Alliance. The centre-right bloc also flipped the crucial populous municipalities Gothenburg, Linköping, Uppsala and Västerås.

The Social Democrats recorded around 35% of the overall support, which was the party's worst showing in the post-war era. Although the red-green parties received a higher proportion of the vote than in the 1991 hung parliament loss, the coalition fell short of a majority by seven seats, or two percentage points of the popular vote.

The Alliance did not reach 50% of the vote, courtesy of several minor parties gathering up 5.67% of the overall vote. This was the final election before the Sweden Democrats entered the Riksdag, with the party getting close to three percent of the vote, falling short by just above one percentage point. The election also saw the party get above 10% in Bjuv Municipality in its Scanian heartlands and above the parliamentary threshold in the country's five southernmost constituencies.

Campaign
The campaigning for the 2006 election began early, as the opposition decided to present itself as a viable alternative government by forming an alliance: Alliance for Sweden. This alliance was negotiated at a meeting held in the village of Högfors, home to the chairman of the Centre Party, Maud Olofsson. The meeting ended on 31 August 2004 with the presentation of a joint declaration outlining the principles under which the four parties intended to run in the election. One year later a similar meeting was held at Bankeryd, home of Göran Hägglund, leader of the Christian Democrats. See Alliance for Sweden for further information.

The Alliance enjoyed a leading position for over a year over the red-green parties, according to most polls. However the gap between the two blocs (s, v, and mp are assumed to work together) began to close rapidly in January 2006, and the red-green parties took the lead in May 2006; indeed they were ahead of the Alliance in every poll conducted in May and June. However, there was a late shift in opinion back to the Alliance during the summer: in mid-August all polls showed the Alliance leading the red-green parties comfortably.

Unemployment

The Social Democrat government's perceived failure to reduce unemployment was a major issue in the campaign, especially considering the good performance of the Swedish economy (when compared with that of the rest of Europe). The opposition also argued that "real" unemployment was much higher than the official figure of 4.8% (as of May 2006). They quoted a figure of 1,037,000 (or 17.9% of the labour force in January 2006) for those who are "outside the labour market because they do not have a job or are studying". If those who are "wholly or partially outside the labour market" are included then the figure rises to 1,700,000. This gloomy view of the unemployment situation was raised by Jan Edling, a former economist for the Swedish Trade Union Confederation (LO). However, compared with other OECD countries Sweden has a low "broad unemployment", as was pointed out by the Green Party's Peter Eriksson in the debate.

Alliance for Sweden proposed to address the problem by cutting income tax for the lowest paid (by increasing the tax-free allowance), cutting the payroll tax (and abolishing it for parts of the service sector), and making wages paid for household work tax-deductible. Critics of the proposed tax cuts said that, because they are funded by reducing unemployment benefit and sick pay, they would attack the most needy in society rather than helping them as Alliance for Sweden claimed.

In addition the Centre Party proposed a special youth contract of employment for those aged under 26, allowing their term of employment to be ended by their employer up to two years after they begin work. This controversial proposal (not adopted by the Alliance as a whole) was intended to increase youth employment by making taking on new employees less risky for the employer, but it was criticised by the red-green parties as reducing job security for the young. A similar contract introduced by the French government (the Contrat première embauche) caused angry demonstrations and riots in France. In a debate article in Göteborgs-Posten on 21 March 2006 Wanja Lundby-Wedin, Chairperson of LO, wrote:
"[Maud Olofsson's] new proposal to abolish job security for the young will not result in more jobs. It will only lead to increased insecurity and an even larger exclusion... More than half of youths under 25 who work already have an insecure job; a time-limited job of some sort. This is most usual among our young female members. The most insecure jobs, 'need-employment' or the so-called 'phone and run locum' is entirely on the employer's terms. Every morning many people sit and wait for their employer to ring. Am I needed today or not?".
Olofsson replied two days later in the same newspaper:
<blockquote>
"What LO'''s Chairperson has not understood is that those youths who already have a job are not covered by our proposal. It does however give a new opportunity for the 146,000 youths who are wholly or partially living in the exclusion the Social Democrats have created... One of the main reasons why companies don't take on new staff is that the risk is too large. If the gamble doesn't pay off then the costs are too great. By lowering the threshold for job creation we are convinced that many youths will be able to take their first steps onto a labour market that they today have never been able to set foot on. We are equally convinced that the great majority of these youths will show their employers that they were right to dare to employ them".
</blockquote>
A survey carried out by the Confederation of Swedish Enterprise (Svenskt Näringsliv) indicates that 41% of Swedish companies believe that such a contract would increase their willingness to hire young people "to a great extent" and that 51% believe that it would increase it "to a certain extent". 7% of those surveyed said that they did not think that they would be more willing to hire.

Computer break-in by Liberal People's Party members

On 4 September 2006, only two weeks before the general election, the Social Democratic Party reported to the police a computer break-in into its internal network. It has been reported that members of the Liberal People's Party copied secret information, not yet officially released, on at least two occasions for the purpose of counter-attacking Social Democratic political propositions. On 5 September the Liberal Party Secretary Johan Jakobsson voluntarily resigned. Leading members of the party and its youth organization are under police investigation suspected for criminal activity.

Opinion polls
The charts below show the results of pre-election polls conducted by the five major polling institutes in Sweden.

TEMO has a summary of all polls conducted since the election in 2002, and is therefore cited as the reference for each poll.

Temo

Sifo

Demoskop

Skop

Ruab

Results

The final results were published on 21 September 2006 by the Swedish Election Authority (Valmyndigheten''). Apart from separating the minor parties, there were no big changes to the preliminary count from the election night. 6,892,009 people were eligible to vote in the election. The results are here compared with the 2002 election. There were 5,551,278 valid ballots cast, a turnout of 82%.

Three hours after the polls closed, the result was clear enough for Moderate Party leader Fredrik Reinfeldt to declare himself the victor and for Göran Persson to announce his resignation as Prime Minister and as leader of the Social Democratic Party. The four centre-right parties of Alliance for Sweden formed, as expected, a government with Fredrik Reinfeldt as Prime Minister. The Speaker had asked Reinfeldt to begin this formation on 19 September but, as is usual, requested the Cabinet of Göran Persson to stay on as a caretaker government until the Riksdag formally elected a new prime minister. The newly elected Riksdag convened on 2 October and the government was presented on 6 October.

The election result is historic in being the worst result for the Social Democrats ever in a general election with universal suffrage (introduced in 1921) and the best result for the Moderates since 1928.

Minor parties, that are not represented in the Riksdag, got a total of 5.7% of the votes, which was an increase of 2.6 percentage points, compared to the 2002 election. Behind this increase lay a great success for the Sweden Democrats, gaining 2.9% (+1.5 percentage points) and thus surpassing the limit (2.5%) for gaining governmental financial support for the next four years. Two new parties, Feminist Initiative (0.7%) and the Pirate Party (0.6%), also contributed to the increase.

Of the 349 elected Riksdag members, 164 (or 47%) were women.

Seat distribution

By municipality

Aftermath
The minority government of Göran Persson's Social Democratic Party attempted, and failed, to gain enough seats to form a majority government, to continue as a minority or to govern in a red-green coalition government. His party had been in power since the 1994 election, and Persson had been Prime Minister since 1996. The Social Democrats before the election had an agreement with the Left Party and the Green Party that gave them an influence on government policy in exchange for their support. However, both the Left Party and the Green Party insisted that any red-green government formed after the election would need to include them in a coalition.

The four centre-right parties – The Moderate Party (m), The Liberal People's Party (fp), The Christian Democrats (kd), and The Centre Party (c) – united in Alliance for Sweden succeeded in gaining enough seats to form a coalition government. The four parties (formerly in opposition) had presented a joint election manifesto (although c, fp, and kd still had individual manifestos). Their candidate for Prime Minister was the Moderate Party leader, Fredrik Reinfeldt.

Analysis
The regime shift that occurred in the 2006 election, however, can be traced to changes in popularity between the party - blocs prior to the campaign really started and to the timing of two extreme natural disasters that combined had a dramatic impact on the Swedish political landscape. In a dissertation from the Department of Government at Uppsala University, entitled "Natural Disasters and National Election", PhD Lina M. Eriksson found in her research that the Indian Ocean’s 2004 Boxing Day Tsunami and 2005 Storm Gudrun (Erwin), which struck only two weeks following the tsunami, impacted on the 2006 historic regime shift that occurred in the 2006 Swedish parliamentary election. The results from this research show that the 2002-2006 incumbent Social Democratic Party's (S) poor crisis response to Gudrun, which is the hitherto most costly natural disaster in Swedish history, alone has an estimated effect of a magnitude that likely was crucial to the 2006 historic regime shift. In the abstract to the thesis one can read "The 2002-2006 incumbent Social Democratic Party (S) received its lowest voter support since 1914 as roughly 150,000, or 8%, of the 2002 S voters went to the main opposition, the conservative Moderate Party (M). This became the most decisive factor in ousting S from power after 12 years of rule. As a result, the M-led Alliance (A) with the People's Party (FP), the Center Party (C), and the Christian Democrats (KD) won the election. Natural Disasters and National Election makes the novel contribution of proposing two natural disasters, the Indian Ocean’s 2004 Boxing Day Tsunami and 2005 Storm Gudrun (Erwin), which struck only two weeks following the tsunami, as major events that impacted government popularity in the 2006 election and contributed to the redistribution of voter support, within and across party-blocs. The core findings from this thesis show that the S government’s poor crisis response to Gudrun, which is the hitherto most costly natural disaster in Swedish history, alone has an estimated effect of a magnitude that likely contributed to the 2006 historic regime shift, while the tsunami also seems to have mattered. The tsunami is particularly interesting, as S’s poor international crisis response to the event constitutes the first natural disaster situation to knowingly have affected an election on the other side of the planet. Moreover, to some degree voters recognized the active opposition by C as effective representation and rewarded the party for its strong stance on the poor handling of both events by S. In fact, the active voice of C concerning these disasters likely helped move the party from the periphery of party politics to becoming the third-largest party in Swedish politics. In sum, this research investigates accountability and effective party representation via retrospective voting, which is an essential mechanism for the legitimacy of democracy. Findings suggest that the average Swedish voter indeed may be voting retrospectively to hold publicly elected officials accountable, which suggest a healthy status of the retrospective voting mechanism and Swedish democracy." Part of the dissertation has also been published in Electoral Studies, which is to be considered the leading scientific journal in election research. In the article long-term effects are also found over the 2010 and 2014 election, which implies that the Storm triggered long-lasting changes in voter support from the left to the right side of the political spectrum. A comprehensive summary of the dissertation is available for download via Uppsala University.

See also
Cabinet of Fredrik Reinfeldt
List of political parties in Sweden

Further reading

References

External links

Guide to the Swedish Election 2006 – The Local
Briefingroom: The insider's guide to... Swedish politics – CNN
 NSD: European Election Database – Sweden publishes regional level election data; allows for comparisons of election results, 1991–2006

General elections in Sweden
Sweden
General election
Sweden